Gabriela is a 1950 West German musical drama film directed by Géza von Cziffra and starring Zarah Leander, Carl Raddatz, and Vera Molnar. It was Leander's comeback film after a seven-year absence from filmmaking. In 1943 when the Nazi leadership had demanded she take German citizenship, she had broken her contract with UFA and returned to her native Sweden. In the immediate post-war era she was banned from appearing in German films because of her previous association with the Nazi hierarchy. When the law was lifted in 1949, she was able to make films once more.

It was shot at the Wandsbek Studios in Hamburg. The film's sets were designed by the art director Herbert Kirchhoff.

It was the third highest-grossing film at the West German box office in 1950.

Plot
Gabriela is a famous singer who became renown following the performance in a bar, where a man fell in love with her. After marriage to Charlie, Gabriella gave birth to Andrea, and subsequently to Hansi. After raising both daughters, was is forced leave them with her spouse, in order to continue her singing career. The daughters, who are now adults, were raised by a foster mother, while Charlie was busy with work and had no time for them. Gabriela, who had matured over time, realizes the mistake she made when she gave the daughters away and is overwhelmed by maternal remorse. However, it's too late now.

Andrea, the oldest of them, is totally estranged from her mother and shows no interest in meeting her. Instead, Andrea is being courted by a young engineer. Meanwhile, Gabriela, with the help of her other daughter, Hansi, finally understands that the glamour life she had as a singer worth nothing comparing to the lost trust of her daughter. But Andrea also makes it clear to Gabriela that she no longer needs her.

Cast

References

External links

West German films
German musical drama films
Films directed by Géza von Cziffra
1950s musical drama films
Real Film films
Films shot at Wandsbek Studios
1950 drama films
German black-and-white films
1950s German films